Teresa Oyibo Ameh is a Nigerian author of children's literature who has worked on the

Early life and education 
Ameh is the first child in a large family and she had her university education at the University of Nigeria, Nsukka where she studied Library Science and English.

Career 
Ameh has written eight books for children and they include:

 The Twins Visit
 The Stepmother and other stories
 Funmi the Polite Girl and other stories
 Lessons from Aunty Talatu
 Drop That Phone
 The Only Son
 The Torn Petal
 The Freedom Day Party

In 2017, she launched the book, The Torn Petal in Abuja, Nigeria.

Awards 
Ameh was honoured by the Abuja Chapter of the Association of Nigerian Authors in recognition of her contribution to the arts.

References 

Living people
Nigerian children's writers
Nigerian women writers
Nigerian women children's writers
Year of birth missing (living people)
Place of birth missing (living people)
University of Nigeria alumni